The Welcome Stranger is the largest alluvial gold nugget ever found.

Welcome Stranger may also refer to:

Film, television, and radio
Welcome Stranger (1924 film), an American lost silent film directed by James Young 
Welcome Stranger (1947 film), an American film directed by Elliott Nugent
"Welcome Stranger" (Lost in Space), a 1965 television episode
"Welcome Stranger", a 1954 episode of Lux Radio Theatre

Literature
Welcome Stranger, a 2002 Point Horror novel by Anthony Masters
"Welcome, Stranger!", a 1963 essay by Isaac Asimov included in his 1965 anthology Of Time and Space and Other Things

Music

Albums
Welcome Stranger (album), by the Blackeyed Susans, 1992
Welcome, Stranger!, by the Blue Aeroplanes, 2017
Welcome Strangers, by Modern Studies, 2018

Songs
"Welcome Stranger", by Daniel Boone, 1963
"Welcome Stranger", by Washington from I Believe You Liar, 2010
"Welcome Stranger", from the 1960s TV series Lost in Space, included on the soundtrack album Lost in Space 40th Anniversary Edition, 2005
"Welcome Stranger", written by Blanche Merrill, 1921

See also
Selections from Welcome Stranger, an album by Bing Crosby from the 1947 film
Welcome the Stranger, a 2018 American mystery film